The 1941 Michigan State Normal Hurons football team represented Michigan State Normal College (later renamed Eastern Michigan University) during the 1941 college football season. In their 20th season under head coach Elton Rynearson, the Hurons compiled a 0–5–2 record, failed to score in five of seven games, and were outscored by all opponents by a combined total of 65 to 12. Andrew L. Newlands was the team captain. The team played its home games at Briggs Field on the school's campus in Ypsilanti, Michigan.

Schedule

References

Michigan State Normal
Eastern Michigan Eagles football seasons
College football winless seasons
Michigan State Normal Hurons football